Life West Gladiatrix are a women's rugby union club based in Hayward, California. The Gladiatrix are named after ancient female Gladiators who were fierce and ruthless in combat and were the equivalent of their male counterparts. They were formed in the fall of 2014 and took the field for the first time in January 2015.

They have won several National Championship titles since then, they won the 2016 Division 2, and, 2017 and 2018 Division 1 championships. 2019 saw them entering the Women's Premier League for the first time and reaching the finals.

History

Life West Rugby 
Dr. Brian Kelly (former President of Life Chiropractic College West) and his colleague Dr. Bruce Chester, established Life West Rugby in late 2013. Dr. Kelly grew up in New Zealand and wanted to establish a top-level rugby program which was realized on January 11, 2014, when the Life West Men's team, the Gladiators, played their first ever league match.

Dr. Kelly wanted to develop a program from the beginning that showcased excellence in rugby and chiropractic. He also wanted to enhance college pride and introduce chiropractic to a wider community. The program provided opportunities for students, alumni, chiropractors and the local community to be involved with the team.

References

External links 
 Official site

Women's Premier League Rugby teams
Women's sports in California
Sports in Hayward, California
Rugby clubs established in 2014
2014 establishments in California